Anastasiya Uladzimirawna Verameyenka (born 10 July 1987) is a Belarusian professional women's basketball player who plays for Horizont Minsk. Veremeyenka was part of the Belarus women's national basketball teams that won a bronze medal at EuroBasket Women 2007 and placed sixth at the 2008 Olympics. Her elder brother Vladimir Veremeenko is also a professional basketball player.

References

External links

1987 births
Living people
Basketball players at the 2008 Summer Olympics
Basketball players at the 2016 Summer Olympics
Belarusian expatriate basketball people in Russia
Belarusian expatriate basketball people in Turkey
Belarusian women's basketball players
Fenerbahçe women's basketball players
Olympic basketball players of Belarus
Power forwards (basketball)
Sportspeople from Kohtla-Järve